Michel Rey-Golliet (21 March 1893 – 18 September 1967) was a French boxer who competed in the 1920 Summer Olympics. In 1920 he was eliminated in the quarter-finals of the middleweight class after losing his fight to the eventual silver medalist Georges Prud'Homme.

References

External links
profile

1893 births
1967 deaths
Middleweight boxers
Olympic boxers of France
Boxers at the 1920 Summer Olympics
French male boxers